"Break My Heart" is a song by Scottish singer-songwriter Malcolm Middleton, from his second album, Into The Woods. It was his third single overall, and his second single from an album, released on 18 September 2005 on Chemikal Underground.

Track listing
Songs, lyrics and music by Malcolm Middleton.
7", Digital download CHEM083
"Break My Heart" – 4:13
"A New Heart" – 2:53
"A Moaning Shite (Solo 6)" – 3:02

Personnel
Malcolm Middleton – guitar, vocals, producer
Alan Barr – cello
Paul Savage – engineer

External links
"Break My Heart" Lyrics

2005 singles
Malcolm Middleton songs
Songs written by Malcolm Middleton
2005 songs